Svein Aaser (born 7 October 1946) is a former CEO of DnB NOR, the largest financial group in Norway. He resigned on 31 December 2006. He is chair of FIS Nordic World Ski Championships 2011 and the National Gallery of Norway

Early career 
Aaser was born in Fredrikstad, Norway and was educated at the Norwegian School of Economics (NHH) where he received his MBA in 1970. By 1976, he had graduated from the Swiss IMD Business School's Program for Executive Development. After obtaining his MBA (1970) he worked his way up in businesses starting as assistant to deputy managing director for Tank Nielsen, M. Peterson & Søn, Moss. From there he became marketing manager of Sarpsborg Papp, Div. Kartong, managing director for NORA matprodukter and of Storebrand Skade.

Later career 
During a period of ten years starting in 1987 he was president and CEO of Hafslund Nycomed who changed its name after the acquisition of Nycomed. The year after saw him deputy CEO and chief executive officer of a subsidiary company called Imaging Nycomed Amersham. In 1998 he was appointed CEO of Den norske Bank, later the merged DnB NOR.

In 2008 he was appointed chairman of the board of the National Gallery of Norway. He has also been the chairman of Marine Harvest, but stepped down in January 2010. He also chairs Statkraft. From 2012 to 2015 he was chairman of the board of Telenor.

References 

1946 births
Living people
Norwegian bankers
DNB ASA people
People from Fredrikstad
Norwegian School of Economics alumni
International Institute for Management Development alumni